Among the population of Indians in Singapore there are many organisations and societies of a religious, cultural, social, educational, professional, business and sporting nature.

Religious organisations

Indian-origin religions

Government bodies

 Hindu Advisory Board
 Hindu Endowments Board
 Sikh Advisory Board

Unity organisations 

 Global Association of Dharma-Dhamma Organisations, Singapore chapter
 Dharma Dhamma Conference, Singapore delegation

Place of worship

Buddhist temples

 Palelai Buddhist Temple
 Sakya Muni Buddha Gaya Temple
 Sri Lankaramaya Buddhist Temple
 Wat Ananda Metyarama Thai Buddhist Temple

Hindu temples

 Darma Muneeswaran Temple
 Sree Guru Raghavendra Seva Samajam
 Shree Lakshmi Narayan Temple
 Sree Maha Mariamman Temple
 Sree Ramar Temple
 Sri Arasakesari Sivan Temple
 Sri Arulmigu Murugan Temple
 Sri Holy Tree Bala Subramaniam Temple
 Sri Krishna Bhagawan Temple
 Sri Layan Sithi Vinayagar Temple
 Sri Manmatha Karuneshvarar Temple
 Sri Mariamman Muneeswarar Temple
 Sri Mariamman Temple
 Sri Muneeswaran Temple
 Sri Murugan Hill Temple
 Sri Ruthra Kaliamman Temple
 Sri Senpaga Vinayagar Temple
 Sri Siva-Krishna Temple
 Sri Sivan Temple
 Sri Srinivasa Perumal Temple
 Sri Thendayuthapani Temple
 Sri Vadapathira Kaliamman Temple
 Sri Vairavimada Kaliamman Temple
 Sri Veeramakaliamman Temple
 Ramakrishna Mission Singapore
 Sri Muneeswarar Peetam

Jain gurudwaras

 Jainism in Singapore

Sikh gurudwaras

 Central Sikh Gurudwara Board
 Khalsa Dharmak Sabha
 Pardesi Khalsa Dharmak Diwan
 Silat Road Sikh Temple
 Sri Guru Nanak Sat Sang Sabha
 Sri Guru Singh Sabha
 Yishun Sikh Temple

Other religious groups

Buddhist religious groups 
 Singapore Sinhala Buddhist Association
 Buddhist Indian Association of Singapore

Hindu religious groups

 Arya Samaj in Singapore
 Durga Devi Amma Society
 Geeta Ashram
 Hindu Tamil Devotees Society
 Krishna Our Guide
 Ksihnam Vandey Jaga Gurum
 Narayana Gurukula
 Prasanthi Sai Mission
 Rajayoga Power Transcendental Meditation Centre, Singapore
 Ramakrishna Sangeetha Sabba
 Saiva Siddhantha Sangam
 Science of Living
 Shiv Mandir
 Shri Parmhans Advait Mat Society
 Singapore Ayyappa Seva Sangham
 Singapore Dakshina Bharata Brahmana Sabha
 Sri Aurobindo Society
 Sri Gnanananda Seva Samajam, Singapore
 Sri Sathya Sai Baba Centre Of Singapore
 Sri Sathya Sai Baba Service Centre
 Sri Sathya Sai Mission
 Sri Sathya Sai Prema Nilayam
 Sri Sathya Sai Seva Centre
 Sri Sathya Sai Society Singapore
 Sri Satya Sai Baba Centre Katong
 Sri Satya Sai Centre Selegie
 The Hindu Centre
 The Singapore Hindu Sabai
 Velmurugan Temple Society

Jain religious group

 Singapore Jain Religious Society

Sikh religious group

 Sikh Sewaks Singapore

Abrahmic religions

Place of worship

Indian churches
 Ang Mo Kio Tamil Methodist Church
 Cornerstone Tamil Fellowship, Under Cornerstone Community Church
 Ebenezer Malayalam Fellowship Singapore, a Malayalam Pentecostal Church
 Jireh Bible Presbyterian Church
 Jesus Lives Church
 Jurong Tamil Methodist Church
 King of Glory Church, Norris Road
 King of Glory Church, Bukit Batok
 Mar Thoma Syrian Church
 My Saviour's Church
 Pasir Panjang Tamil Methodist Church
 Philadelphia House of Fellowship
 New Hope Family Church Tamil and Hindi church
 Seletar Tamil Methodist Church
 Sembawang Tamil Methodist Church
 Smyrna Assembly (Life Centre) (English, Tamil, Telugu and Malayalam church)] 
 South Asian International Fellowship (English, Tamil, Telugu and Hindi church in Singapore)
 St. Thomas Orthodox Syrian Cathedral
 Tamil Methodist Church

Indian mosques

 Masjid Abdul Gafoor
 Masjid Al-Abrar
 Masjid Al-Falah
 Masjid Angullia
 Masjid Bencoolen
 Masjid Hajjah Fatimah
 Masjid Jamae
 Masjid Malabar
 Masjid Moulana Md Ali
 Masjid Radin Mas
 Masjid Sultan

Other religious organisations

Muslim religious groups
 Dakhni Urdu Association
 Federation of Indian Muslims
 Islamic Fellowship Association
 Indian Muslim Social Service Association (IMSSA)
 Kayalpatnam Welfare Association
 Kilakkarai Welfare Association
 Koothanallur Association of Singapore
 Malabar Muslim Jama-ath
 Muthupettai Association
 Nagapattinam Association Singapore
 Nagore Association
 Podakkudi Association
 Rifayee Thareeq Association of Singapore
 Singapore Kadayanallur Muslim League
 Singapore Tenkasi Muslim Welfare Society
 Singapore Thuckalay Muslim Association
 South Indian Jamiathul Ulama
 Tariqatu-l Arusiyyatu-l Qadiriyya Worldwide Association
 The Jameyathul Muslimin of B&C Mutlur
 Thiruvithancode Muslim Union
 Thopputhurai Muslim Association
 United Indian Muslim Association

Arts and sports groups

Arts groups
 AGAM Theatre Lab
 Apsaras Arts Performing Arts Company
 Association of Singapore Tamil Writers
 Bhaskar's Arts Academy Ltd
 Damaru Singapore
 Indian Arts Centre
 Indian Cultural Society
 Kala Mandhir
 Naujawan Orchestra
 Nrityalaya Aesthetics Society
 Sikh Cultural and Literary Society
 Singapore Indian Artistes' Association
 Singapore Indian Fine Arts Society
 Singapore Kairalee Kala Nilayam
 Singapore Kairalee Film Forum
 Society Of Kalai Pithers
 Soorya (Singapore)
 Sri Saktivilas Mission
 Tamil Language And Cultural Society
 The Naval Base Kerala Library
 Vaineeka Music

Sports and recreation clubs
 Balestier Khalsa FC
 Ceylon Sports Club
 India International Insurance Sports & Recreation Club
 Indian Bank Recreation Club
 Indian Overseas Bank Recreation Club
 Sikh Sports Club
 Silambam Art Association
 Singapore Indian Association
 Singapore Indian Football Club
 Singapore Khalsa Association FC

Education and welfare groups

Co-operatives and welfare groups

 Annamalai University Alumni Association (Singapore Chapter)
 Gnananandam Mission Singapore Chapter Ltd
 Indian Community Welfare Centre
 IT Services Cooperative Ltd
 Jamal Mohamed College Alumni Association (Singapore Chapter)
 Navajeevan Centre
 Ramakrishna Mission
 SANA Hindu Aftercare
 SANA Sikh Aftercare
 Sikh Welfare Council
 Singapore Indian Development Association (SINDA)
 Singapore Haryanvi Kunba
 Singapore Indian Education Trust
 Singapore Sikh Education Foundation
 Singapore Tenkasi Muslim Welfare Society
 Sree Narayana Mission
 Thopputhurai Muslim Association (Singapore)

Schools and educational institutions
 Christ Church Kindergarten
 DAV Hindi School
 Hindi Society Singapore
 Hariprasad Childcare
 Khalsa Kindergarten
 Radha Soami Satsang Beas Singapore
 Saraswathy Education Centre
 Singapore Tamils IT Society
 Umar Pulavar Tamil Language Centre
 Urdu Development Society
 Vithya Kindergarten
 Bangla Language and Literary Society, Singapore

Social and professional groups

Business and professional groups
 Chettiars Nattukkottai Chamber Of Commerce
 Indian Institutes of Technology Alumni Association
 Indian Institute of Management Ahmedabad Alumni Association
 Professional Network of Young Indians
 Serangoon Merchants Association
 Sikh Money Lenders and Businessmen Association
 Sindhi Merchants Association
 Singapore Indian Chamber of Commerce & Industry
 Singapore Sri Lanka Business Association
 Singapore Tamil Teachers' Union

Social and cultural community groups
 Indian Muslim Social Service Association (Singapore)
 Bengali Association Of Singapore 
 BiJhar (Singapore) 
 Haryanvi Khap of Singapore
 Kannada Sangha (Singapore)
 Koothanallur Family Club
 Little India Shopkeepers and Heritage Association (LISHA)
 Maharashtra Mandal
 Marwari Mitra Mandal
 National University of Singapore Tamil Language Society
 Odia Society of Singapore(OSS)
 Sembawang Tamils Association
 Singapore Tamil Community (STC online Group) https://www.SgTamilCommunity.online
 Singapore Bengali Society
 Singapore Ceylon Tamils Association
 Singapore Gujarati Society
 Singapore Kerala Association
 Singapore Kairalee Kalanilayam
 Singapore Malayalee Hindu Samajam
 Singapore North Indian Hindu Association
 Singapore Indian League
 Singapore Tamil Youths' Club
 Singapore Tamilian Association
 Singai Tamil Sangam
 Singapore Tamizhar Eyakkam
 Singapore Telugu Samajam 
 Society of Indian Students (formerly: Society of Indian Scholars)
 Tamils Information Technology Society, Singapore) -https://www.STiTSociety.org
 Tamils Representative Council (TRC)
 Tamils Reform Association
 Telangana Cultural Society (Singapore) - www.tcs-singapore.org
 Thamizhvel Narppani Mandram
 Thiruvalluvar Tamil Valarchik Kazhakam
 Yarthavar Association
 Surya Keeridam Association
 Odia Society of Singapore: http://singodia.org

See also

 Context 
 1915 Singapore Mutiny
 Greater India
 History of Indian influence on Southeast Asia
 History of Singaporean Indians
 Indian diaspora
 Indianisation
 Indian National Army in Singapore
 Hinduism in South East Asia
 Indian-origin religions and people in Singapore
 Arya Samaj in Singapore
 Hinduism in Singapore
 Jainism in Singapore
 Indian Singaporeans
 List of Hindu temples in Singapore
 Lists of Hindu temples by country
 Singaporean Indians

References

External links

Indian diaspora in Singapore
Overseas Indian organisations